Hawen is a hamlet located  from Cardiff and  from London in Troedyraur, Ceredigion, Wales. Hawen is represented in the Senedd by Elin Jones (Plaid Cymru)  and the Member of Parliament is Ben Lake (Plaid Cymru) for the Ceredigion constituency. He won the seat at the 2017 general election, gaining the seat from Liberal Democrat Mark Williams with 11,623 (29.2%) of the vote.

See also
River Hawen
List of localities in Wales by population

References

Villages in Ceredigion